Genesis Gaming Solutions is a United States casino gaming company founded in 1999 and headquartered in Spring, Texas. Genesis Gaming provides casino gaming hardware and software that support casino and table management and player tracking systems.

BRAVO Pit, developed by Genesis, is a software application that assists casinos in the organization of poker games, including table management and player tracking.

References

External links
 

Gambling companies of the United States
American companies established in 1999